Demydivka Raion was a raion in Rivne Oblast in western Ukraine. Its administrative center was the urban-type settlement of Demydivka. The raion was abolished and its territory was merged into Dubno Raion on 18 July 2020 as part of the administrative reform of Ukraine, which reduced the number of raions of Rivne Oblast to four. The last estimate of the raion population was

See also
Subdivisions of Ukraine

References

External links
rv.gov.ua 

Former raions of Rivne Oblast
1995 establishments in Ukraine
Ukrainian raions abolished during the 2020 administrative reform